Resolver is the third studio album by the American alternative rock band Veruca Salt. It was released on May 16, 2000, on Beyond Records, followed by an Australian release on December 6, 2002. The album was the first for the band after the departure of all the founding members but Louise Post, who became the band's sole frontwoman. 

Like their previous album, Eight Arms to Hold You, the title is inspired by The Beatles; in this case, a play on the title of their 1966 album Revolver.

Production
The album was produced by Brian Liesegang.

Critical reception
The Chicago Tribune wrote that Resolver is the album "in which Post and Veruca Salt blow past the years of snide hipster innuendo that somehow they just weren't good enough, a pop concoction cashing in on a trend (female-fronted alternative-rock bands) with a formulaic, bubblegum version of a once-revolutionary sound (the soft-loud dynamics, whispered verses and raging choruses of the Pixies, Nirvana and the Breeders)." The Washington Post thought that "what distinguishes Resolver is not a new style but a newfound consistency. Track for track, this is the band's catchiest album."

Track listing
All songs written by Louise Post, except where noted.

Personnel 
Louise Post - bass guitar, guitar, keyboards, vocals, production, artwork, layout design
Kevin Tihista - bass guitar, guitar, vocals
Stephen Fitzpatrick - guitar
Matt Walker - percussion, drums
Eric Remschneider - cello
Scott Pazera - additional guitars
Brian Liesegang - programming, production, editing
Travis King - engineering, production assistant, sound design, cover art, cover image
Joe Barresi - mixing
Howie Weinberg - mastering
Randy Nicklaus - A&R
Scott Steiner - programming, editing
Chad Adams - engineering, editing
Joe Wohlmuth - assistant
Joshua Shapera - assistant

Chart positions

Album 
 2000	Resolver Billboard 200 # 171

References

External links
 Official artist website

Veruca Salt albums
2000 albums